Ray Davies (26 September 1932 – 21 February 1984) was  a former Australian rules footballer who played with Fitzroy in the Victorian Football League (VFL).

Notes

External links 

1932 births
1984 deaths
Australian rules footballers from Victoria (Australia)
Fitzroy Football Club players